Scott Stallings (born March 25, 1985) is an American professional golfer who plays on the PGA Tour.

Early life and amateur career
Stallings was born in Worcester, Massachusetts. He attended Oak Ridge High School in Oak Ridge, Tennessee, and was an all-state golfer and a four-year member of the Dean's List. He attended Tennessee Tech, where he was a two-time Ohio Valley Conference Player of the Year, winning seven tournaments and named an All-American in 2006.

Professional career
In 2008 and 2009, Stallings played on the Tarheel Tour and the NGA Hooters Tour. In 2009, he made his first trip to the PGA Tour's Qualifying School, where he missed a PGA Tour card by a single stroke. His finish gave him status on the Nationwide Tour. He made 19 cuts in 28 events and finished 53rd on the Nationwide Tour. He returned to Q School in 2010 and finished T11 to earn his card for 2011. He struggled at the beginning and he missed his first five cuts, then finished T42 at the Puerto Rico Open for his first PGA Tour finish. His next event, the Transitions Championship, earned him a third-place finish. Thanks to a favor from practice partner Kenny Perry, who is sponsored by tournament sponsor Transitions Optical and shares an agent with Stallings, Stallings got into the tournament on a sponsor exemption. The third-place finish was the highest for a sponsor exemption at this event.

Stallings won the Greenbrier Classic in July 2011 for his first PGA Tour victory. Despite struggling at times during the final round, Stallings was able to earn his way into a three-way playoff. He made a birdie on the first playoff hole, while his opponents, Bob Estes and Bill Haas made par, which gave him the title. The win moved Stallings from 88th in the FedEx Cup standings to 26th. His OWGR ranking went from 224th to 119th, after starting the year at 562nd. The win also qualified Stallings for the 2011 WGC-Bridgestone Invitational, 2011 PGA Championship, 2012 Masters Tournament, and the 2012 Players Championship. Stallings won his second career tournament at the 2012 True South Classic. Stallings was unable to defend his title in Mississippi because he earned a spot in the 2013 Open Championship after an already exempt Phil Mickelson won the Scottish Open. It was the second consecutive major Stallings earned entry as an alternate; he gained entry into the U.S. Open after another player withdrew.

In January 2014, Stallings won the Farmers Insurance Open by a single stroke from five other players. The following year, in defense of his title, Stallings lost in a four-man sudden-death playoff, after coming from three strokes behind in the final round. He was eliminated on the first extra hole, when he could only make a par.

On July 7, 2015, Stallings was given a three-month suspension for violating the Tour's drug policy. He took a supplement that was on the banned substances list and self-reported his violation to the PGA Tour.

Personal life
Stallings is a Christian. Stallings has spoken about his faith saying, "...I know that my score on the course doesn’t define who I am. I’m thankful for where God has placed me at this time in my life. Every day I wake up and thank Him for the opportunity He’s given me to let His light shine through me, and I pray that will always be the case."

Professional wins (3)

PGA Tour wins (3)

PGA Tour playoff record (1–1)

Results in major championships
Results not in chronological order in 2020.

CUT = missed the half-way cut
"T" = tied
NT = No tournament due to COVID-19 pandemic

Results in The Players Championship

CUT = missed the halfway cut
"T" indicates a tie for a place
C = Canceled after the first round due to the COVID-19 pandemic

Results in World Golf Championships

QF, R16, R32, R64 = Round in which player lost in match play
"T" = Tied

See also
2010 PGA Tour Qualifying School graduates
2016 Web.com Tour Finals graduates

References

External links

American male golfers
PGA Tour golfers
Korn Ferry Tour graduates
Golfers from Massachusetts
Golfers from Knoxville, Tennessee
Tennessee Tech Golden Eagles athletes
Sportspeople from Worcester, Massachusetts
People from Oak Ridge, Tennessee
1985 births
Living people